Thank You for Being a Friend is a 1978 song by Andrew Gold

Thank You for Being a Friend may also refer to:
 Thank You for Being a Friend (album), 1997 album by Andrew Gold 
 Thank You for Being a Friend, 2017 album by 88 Fingers Louie
 Thank You for Being a Friend, 2017 song from My Little Pony: The Movie